The European Paralympic Committee (EPC) is an international non for profit organisation which serves a membership of 49 National Paralympic Committees and 9 European branches of disability. Based in Vienna, Austria, the EPC was founded as the IPC European Committee, it was later registered as an independent entity in 1999.

The EPC is responsible for organising the European Paralympic Committee Youth Games. Furthermore, the EPC acts as an organisation which promotes and defends the collective interests of National Paralympic Committees, International Organisation of Sports for the Disabled or International Paralympic Sport Federation and European athletes with disabilities.

The EPC has a democratic structure and the governing body of the organisation is elected every two years through a general assembly, where all registered members are entitled to send delegates and cast their vote. The Committee is made up of a president, secretary-general, treasurer, technical officer, athletes' representative and four members-at-large. The current president is Ratko Kovačić from Croatia, a former table tennis champion.

Member countries 
In the following table, the year in which the NPC was recognized by the International Paralympic Committee (IPC) is also given if it is different from the year in which the NPC was created.

Events

European Para Championships

The European Para Championships are held every four years in the year proceeding the Summer Paralympic Games and have been given the status of a regional games by the European Paralympic Committee.

European Para Youth Games (EPYG) 

The European Para Youth Games is a biennial multi-sport event for young para-athletes aged between 13 and 23.

European Winter Para Sports Event
The first European Winter Para Sports Event was held in 2020 in Poland:

See also
 International Paralympic Committee
 European Olympic Committees

References

External links
 European Paralympic Committee - official Website
 European Paralympic Committee Youth Games - official Website

European sports federations
Paralympic Committees
European Paralympic Committee
1999 establishments in Europe
Sports organizations established in 1999